Arjun Kumar Basnet (born December 5, 1975) is a Nepalese marathon runner. Basnet represented Nepal at the 2008 Summer Olympics in Beijing, where he competed for the men's marathon. He finished the race in forty-fifth place, approximately 26 seconds behind South Africa's Hendrick Ramaala, with his personal best time of 2:23:09.

References

External links
 

NBC Olympics Profile

Living people
1975 births
People from Solukhumbu District
Nepalese male long-distance runners
Nepalese male marathon runners
Olympic athletes of Nepal
Athletes (track and field) at the 2008 Summer Olympics
Athletes (track and field) at the 2002 Asian Games
Athletes (track and field) at the 2006 Asian Games
Asian Games competitors for Nepal